Christmasville is an unincorporated community in Haywood County, Tennessee, United States.

References

Unincorporated communities in Haywood County, Tennessee
Unincorporated communities in Tennessee